The diocese of Bova was a Roman Catholic diocese in Calabria in Italy from the seventh century until 1986.

Ordinaries

Diocese of Bova
Erected: 7th Century
Latin name: Bovensis
Metropolitan: Archdiocese of Reggio Calabria

Giovanni Dominici, O.P. (1412–1419 Died)
...
Sante  (1435–1441 Resigned)
...
Marcello Franci  (1577–)
Bartolomeo Corsini  (1587–1590 Died)
Giovanni Camerota  (1592–1622 Died)
Nicola Maria Madaffari  (2 May 1622 – 1627 Died)
Fabio Olivadisi  (1627–1646 Appointed, Bishop of Catanzaro)
Martino Megali  (1646–1656 Died)
Bernardino d'Aragona  (1657–1669 Died)
Marco Antonio Contestabile  (1669–1699 Died)
Francesco Antonio Gaudiosi, O.P. (1699–1714 Died)
Paolo Stabile, O.M. (1718–1729 Died)
Giuseppe Barone  (1729–1731 Appointed, Bishop of Marsi)
Tommaso Giosafat Melina  1731–1735 Died)
Domenico de Marzano  (1735–1752 Died)
Stefano Moràbito  (1752–1764 Resigned)
Antonio Spedalieri  (1764–1791 Died)
Giuseppe Martini  (1792–1802 Died)
Nicola-Maria Laudisio, C.SS.R.  (1819–1824 Confirmed, Bishop of Policastro)
Giovanni Corcione  (1824–1830 Died)
Giuseppe Maria Giove, O.F.M. Ref.  (1832–1834 Confirmed, Bishop of Gallipoli)
Vincenzo Rozzolino  (1835–1849 Confirmed, Bishop of Caserta)
Pasquale Taccone  (1849–1850 Confirmed, Bishop of Teramo)
Raffaele Ferrigno  (1851–1856 Confirmed, Archbishop of Brindisi)
Dalmazio d'Andrea, O.F.M. Cap.  (1856–1870 Died)
Antonio Piterà  (1871–1876 Resigned)
Nicola de Simone  (1877–1895 Died)
Raffaele Rossi  (1895–1899 Appointed, Archbishop of Acerenza e Matera)
Domenico Pugliatti  (1900–1914 Died)
Paolo Albera  (1915–1921 Resigned)
Andrea Taccone  (1923–1929 Appointed, Bishop of Ruvo e Bitonto)
Giuseppe Cognata, S.D.B.  (1933–1940 Resigned)
Enrico Montalbetti, Obs. S.C.  (1941–1943 Died)
Antonio Lanza  (1943–1950 Died)
Giovanni Ferro, C.R.S.  (1950–1960 Resigned)
Giuseppe Lenotti  (1960–1962 Appointed, Bishop of Foggia)
Aureliano Sorrentino  (1962–1966 Appointed, Bishop of Potenza e Marsico Nuovo)
Giovanni Ferro, C.R.S.  (1973–1977 Retired)
Aureliano Sorrentino  (1977–1986 Appointed, Archbishop of Reggio Calabria-Bova)

References

External links
 GCatholic.org

Former Roman Catholic dioceses in Italy
Roman Catholic dioceses in Calabria
Dioceses established in the 7th century